Ebano may refer to:

Dalbergia funera, a species of legume found in El Salvador and Guatemala
Ébano, San Luis Potosí, a town and municipality in Mexico